Asa River may refer to:

Asa River (Japan)
Asa (Kazakhstan)
Asa River (Venezuela) - see List of rivers in Venezuela

See also
Assa (river), a tributary of the Sunzha in Russia